NeVe 1 is a supergiant elliptical galaxy and the central, dominant member of the Ophiuchus Cluster, about 411 million light-years away from Earth behind the Zone of Avoidance region of the sky. It is notable for being the host galaxy of the Ophiuchus Supercluster eruption, the most energetic astronomical event known.

Observation history 

Despite being in the relatively nearby, large Ophiuchus Cluster, due to its location behind the Milky Way galactic disc relative to the Earth's perspective (known as the Zone of Avoidance), the majority of the cluster including NeVe 1 are invisible to the naked eye, such that it can only be observed in wavelengths beyond the visible spectrum, such as X-rays and infrared. 

When first observed in 1985 it was initially thought to be a planetary nebula within the large, star-forming Rho Ophiuchi cloud complex. In a catalogue published by the German astronomers Thorsten Neckel and Hans Vehrenberg using data retrieved from the Palomar Observatory Sky Survey, the object was then assigned as the first entry of their Atlas of Galactic Planetary Nebulae (NeVe, from their initials Neckel and Vehrenberg). The "planetary nebula" was then further incorporated in the Strasbourg-ESO Catalogue of Galactic Planetary Nebulae in 1991. 

In a subsequent survey using six films from the ESO/SERC Sky Survey Atlas, at least 4,100 galaxies including NeVe 1 were identified. This was further attested by the detection of luminous X-ray and radio emission in NeVe 1 that is indicative of an active galactic nucleus. Thus, NeVe 1 has been truly identified not as a nearby planetary nebula from a dying star, but a full-fledged giant galaxy lying beyond the Milky Way.

Characteristics 

NeVe 1's location in the sky behind the plane of the Milky Way makes it very difficult to study in the optical wavelengths. Using near-infrared and X-ray measurements it is shown to be a large elliptical galaxy—probably one of the largest such galaxies near the Milky Way, with the diameter twice that of Messier 87. Observations using the Chandra X-ray Observatory in 2010 revealed that NeVe 1 sits at the center of a comet-like structure of its host cluster, indicative of ram-pressure stripping and the merger of at least two smaller subclusters. This enormous structure may have slowed down the velocity of NeVe 1 via the interaction of its stars and dark matter. The head of the structure sits about 4 kiloparsecs (13,000 light-years) from NeVe 1 and the galaxy itself is classified as a cooling core with high X-ray emission in contrast to the hot, intracluster medium of the Ophiuchus Cluster.

Eruption 

In a paper published in 2020, NeVe 1 and its surrounding region has been identified as an extreme example of a giant radio fossil—with structures indicative of a much more violent AGN activity in the past. In the case of NeVe 1 there is a striking concave arc terminating the bubble of the X-ray structure surrounding the galaxy, with smaller mini-lobes that may be a result of further, smaller activity of its AGN. This concave arc is part of an enormous cavity, a void region of the intracluster medium with the diameter of at least 460 kpc (1.5 million light-years) that corresponds to an extensive, radio-emitting structure extending throughout the cluster.

The creation of such an enormous cavity could be explained by an extraordinarily large AGN outburst from NeVe 1. Assuming that the cavity and NeVe 1 are roughly in the same radial orientation relative to Earth, the energy required to create the cavity (factoring in the density of the intracluster medium of the Ophiuchus Cluster that resist and must be displaced by the expansion) would be on the order of  ergs of energy. This violent outburst, likely to have happened no less than 240 million years before, is the Ophiuchus Supercluster eruption—the most energetic astronomical event known. It was five times more powerful than the outburst at the galaxy cluster MS 0735.6+7421, and 5.7 million times more powerful than GRB 080916C—the most energetic gamma-ray burst known. Such an equivalent amount of energy, if captured and used with 100% efficiency, could supply the Earth's global energy consumption for the next  years—near the end of the Degenerate Era of the Universe.

The outburst has been attested to have been generated by NeVe 1's central supermassive black hole, which may have consumed an equivalent of 270 million solar masses of material—possibly from a cannibalized dwarf galaxy—that generated shock waves and relativistic jets of high-energy particles that displaced the intracluster medium to form the cavity.  The eruption occurred slowly over millions of years and released as much energy equivalent to thousands of gamma-ray bursts per year. 

The question remains as to how the still extant cool core of NeVe 1 would have survived such a cataclysmic activity, which would have completely destroyed the core. It has been suggested that the eruption may be the result of some form of large-scale hydrodynamic activity within the intracluster medium, allowing it to distribute the energy by a Kelvin–Helmholtz instability eddy allowing the core to survive. Such structures have been found in the similar Perseus Cluster and its galaxy NGC 1275.

This observation is a result of collaboration among various space-based and Earth-based observatories including the Hubble Space Telescope, the Chandra X-ray Observatory, ESA’s XMM Newton X-ray space observatory and radio data from the Murchison Widefield Array (MWA) in Australia and the Giant Metrewave Radio Telescope (GMRT) in India.

References

See also
MS 0735.6+7421—galaxy cluster whose eruption was the previously known most energetic astronomical event
NGC 1275
Messier 87
Orders of magnitude (energy)

Elliptical galaxies
Ophiuchus (constellation)
Astronomical objects discovered in 1985
X-ray astronomy
Astronomical X-ray sources